Popoudina brosi is a moth of the family Erebidae. It was described by Hervé de Toulgoët in 1986. It is found in Tanzania.

References

 

Endemic fauna of Tanzania
Spilosomina
Moths described in 1986
Insects of Tanzania
Moths of Africa